Tyler James Sikkema (born July 25, 1998) is an American professional baseball pitcher in the Kansas City Royals organization. He played college baseball for the Missouri Tigers.

Amateur career
Sikkema attended Central DeWitt High School in DeWitt, Iowa. In 2016, his senior season, he went 8-1 with a 1.03 ERA, earning All-State honors. Unselected in the 2016 Major League Baseball draft, he enrolled at the University of Missouri where he played college baseball for the Missouri Tigers.

In 2017, Sikkema's freshman year at Missouri, he appeared in 22 games (three starts), pitching to an 8-2 record with a 2.72 ERA and four saves, earning a spot on the All-SEC Freshman Team. As a sophomore in 2018, Sikkema pitched in 16 games (making ten starts), going 3-5 with a 3.34 ERA. After the season, he played for the Falmouth Commodores of the Cape Cod Baseball League where he went 1-3 with a 1.72 ERA in  innings, and was named a league all-star. In 2019, his junior season, he compiled a 7-4 record with a 1.32 ERA in 17 games (13 starts), striking out 101 batters in  innings. He was named to the All-SEC Second Team.

Professional career

New York Yankees organization
Sikkema was selected by the New York Yankees with the 38th overall selection of the 2019 Major League Baseball draft. He signed with the Yankees for the slot value of $1.95 million and made his professional debut with the Staten Island Yankees of the Class A Short Season New York–Penn League. Over  innings, he gave up one run. He did not play a minor league game in 2020 due to the cancellation of the minor league season caused by the COVID-19 pandemic. He missed all of the 2021 season due to a shoulder injury.

Sikkema was assigned to the Hudson Valley Renegades of the High-A South Atlantic League to begin the 2022 season.

Kansas City Royals organization
On July 27, 2022, Sikkema (alongside Beck Way and Chandler Champlain) was traded to the Kansas City Royals in exchange for Andrew Benintendi. He was subsequently assigned to the Northwest Arkansas Naturals of the Double-A Texas League. Over 18 starts between Hudson Valley and Northwest Arkansas, Sikkema went 1-6 with a 4.83 ERA and 83 strikeouts over 69 innings. He was selected to play in the Arizona Fall League for the Surprise Saguaros after the season.

References

External links

Missouri Tigers bio

1998 births
Living people
People from Clinton, Iowa
Baseball players from Iowa
Baseball pitchers
Missouri Tigers baseball players
Staten Island Yankees players
Hudson Valley Renegades players
Northwest Arkansas Naturals players
Falmouth Commodores players